Roel Cortez (born Roel Corpuz; November 13, 1957 – April 1, 2015) was a Filipino singer and songwriter who rose to fame in the 1980s due to his Tagalog hit songs such as "Napakasakit, Kuya Eddie", "Dalagang Probinsyana", "Pinay sa Japan"  and "Bakit Ako'y Sinaktan".

His other songs include "Baleleng" (Tagalog version), "Iniibig Kita" and "Sa Mata Makikita". In 1992, Universal Records released a compilation album entitled Best of Roel Cortez, later with a videoke edition of Napakasakit Kuya Eddie: Roel Cortez Video CD Karaoke in 2000.

Musical career
In 1984, he had a hit song in his home country with "Napakasakit, Kuya Eddie" on the WEA Records (now Universal Records) label, which also became something of an anthem for overseas Filipino workers. By then, he had changed his surname to Cortez, and he married his wife Corazon. Through his music, he was also able to finance a Civil Engineering course for his wife at the Technological Institute of the Philippines. Together, they started 'CPC Builders', based in Marilao, Bulacan. He also found fame with his Tagalog version of "Baleleng", and with "Iniibig Kita". In 1992, he released his compilation album, Best of Roel Cortez, a compilation album containing 16 songs.

Death
Cortez died of colon cancer on April 1, 2015 at 9:30 p.m., at the age of 57.

Discography

Albums

Studio albums 
Napakasakit Kuya Eddie (1985, WEA)
Tanging Pag-Ibig Mo (1986, WEA)
Paniwalaan Mo (1987, WEA)
Isang Iglap (1990, WEA)
Disiplina (1996, Universal Records)

Compilation albums 
Best of Roel Cortez (1992, Universal Records)

Karaoke albums 
Napakasakit Kuya Eddie: Roel Cortez (2000, Universal Records)

Songs
 "Ang Mahal Ko'y Ikaw Pa Rin"
 "Bakit"
 "Bakit Ako'y Sinaktan"
 "Bakit Puso'y Nasusugatan"
 "Baleleng"
 "Dalagang Probinsyana"
 "Halika Na"
 "Happy, Happy Birthday To You"
 "Iba Ka Sa Lahat"
 "Iniibig Kita"
 "Kahit Hindi Ka Na Malaya"
 "Kahit Malayo Ka"
 "Kay Sarap Mabuhay"
 "May Tama Ako Sa'yo"
 "Napakasakit Kuya Eddie"
 "Nasaan Ka Aking Mahal"
 "Neneng"
 "Paniwalaan Mo"
 "Panyolito"
 "Pinay sa Japan"
 "Sa Mata Makikita"
 "Sa'yo Ibibigay"
 "Tanging Pag-Ibig Mo"
 "Tutulungan Kita"
 "Unang Pag-Ibig"
 "Walang Ibang Mamahalin"

References

External links
https://www.youtube.com/user/RoelCortezMusic
http://ilovekhymcafe.com/page/home/roel_cortez

1967 births
2015 deaths
Filipino singer-songwriters
20th-century Filipino male singers
Filipino folk singers
People from Bulacan
Deaths from cancer in the Philippines
Deaths from colorectal cancer